David de Rothschild may refer to Rothschild family members:
 David René de Rothschild (born 1942), French banker, head of Group Rothschild
 David Mayer de Rothschild (born 1978), British adventurer and environmentalist